Following is a list of justices of the Utah Supreme Court.

List of chief justices

Utah Territory Supreme Court (1850–96) 
 Lemuel G. Brandenbury (sometimes spelled Brandeberg), 1851
 Lazarus H. Reed, 1852
 John F. Kinney 1853–1857
 Delana R. Eckels, 1857–1860
 John F. Kinney, 1860–1863
 John Titus, 1863–1868
 Charles C. Wilson, 1868–1870
 James B. McKean, 1870–1875
 David Perley Lowe, 1875
 Alexander White, 1875
 Michael Schaeffer, 1876–1879
 John A. Hunter, 1879–1884
 Charles S. Zane, 1884–1888; 1889–1894
 Elliott Sandford, 1888
 Samuel A. Merritt, 1894–1896

Utah Supreme Court (since statehood) 
 Charles S. Zane, 1896–1899
 George W. Bartch, 1899–1901
 James A. Miner, 1896–1903
 Robert N. Baskin, 1903–1905
 George W. Bartch, 1905–1906
 William M. McCarty, 1906–1908
 Daniel N. Straup, 1908–1910
 Joseph E. Frick, 1910–1912
 William M. McCarty, 1912–1915
 Daniel N. Straup, 1915–1917
 Joseph E. Frick, 1917–1919
 Elmer E. Corfman, 1919–1923
 Albert J. Weber, 1923–1925
 Valentine Gideon, 1925–1927
 Samuel R. Thurman, 1927–1929
 James W. Cherry, 1929–1933
 Daniel N. Straup, 1933–1935
 Elias Hansen, 1935–1937
 William H. Folland, 1937–1939
 David W. Moffat, 1939–1943
 James H. Wolfe, 1943–1944
 Martin M. Larson, 1945–1946
 Roger I. McDonough, 1947–1948
 Eugene E. Pratt, 1949–1951
 James H. Wolfe, 1951–1954
 Roger I. McDonough, 1954–1959
 J. Allen Crockett, 1959–1961
 Lester A. Wade, 1961–1963
 F. Henri Henriod, 1963–1967
 J. Allen Crockett, 1967–1970
 E. R. Callister, 1971–1975
 F. Henri Henriod, 1975–1976
 A. H. Ellett, 1977–1979
 J. Allen Crockett, 1979–1981
 Richard J. Maughan, 1981
 Gordon R. Hall, 1981–1994
 Michael D. Zimmerman, 1994–1998
 Richard C. Howe, 1998–2002
 Christine M. Durham,   2002–2012
 Matthew B. Durrant,   2012–

List of associate justices

Utah Territory Supreme Court (1850–96)
 Perry E. Brocchus, 1850–51
 Zerubbabel Snow, 1850–54
 Leonidas Shaver, 1852–55
 William W. Drummond, 1855–57
 George P. Stiles, 1854–57
 Charles E. Sinclair, 1857–60
 Emery D. Potter, 1857 (declined appointment)
 John Cradlebaugh, 1858–60
 Henry R. Crosbie, 1860–61
 R. P. Flenniken, 1860–61
 Thomas J. Drake, 1862–69
 Charles B. Waite, 1862–64
 Solomon P. McCurdy, 1864–68
 Enos D. Hoge, 1868–69
 Cyrus M. Hawley, 1869–73
 Obed F. Strickland, 1869–73
 Jacob S. Boreman, 1873–80
 Phillip H. Emerson, 1873–76
 John M. Coghlan, 1876–80
 Stephen R. Twiss, 1880–84
 Jacob S. Boreman, 1885–89
 Orlando W. Powers, 1885–86
 Henry P. Henderson, 1886–89
 John W. Judd, 1888–89
 Thomas J. Anderson, 1889–93
 John W. Blackburn, 1889–93
 George W. Bartch, 1893–94
 Harvey W. Smith, 1893–95
 William H. King, 1894–96
 Henry H. Rolapp, 1895–96

Utah Supreme Court (since statehood)
 George W. Bartch, 1896–1906
 James A. Miner, 1896–1903
 Charles S. Zane, 1896–1899
 Robert N. Baskin, 1899–1905
 William M. McCarty, 1903–1918
 Daniel N. Straup, 1905–1917
 Joseph E. Frick, 1906–1927
 Elmer E. Corfman, 1917–1923
 Valentine Gideon, 1917–1927
 Samuel R. Thurman, 1917–1929
 Albert J. Weber, 1919–1925
 James W. Cherry, 1923–1933
 Daniel N. Straup, 1925–1935
 Elias Hansen, 1927–35
 Valentine Gideon, 1927–1929
 William H. Folland, 1929–1937
 Ephraim Hanson, 1929–1938
 David W. Moffat, 1933–1944
 James H. Wolfe, 1935–1954
 Martin M. Larson, 1937–1946
 Roger I. McDonough, 1939–1966
 Eugene E. Pratt, 1941–1951
 Lester A. Wade, 1943–1966
 Abe W. Turner, 1944–1946
 J. Allen Crockett, 1951–1981
 F. Henri Henriod, 1951–1976
 George W. Latimer, 1954–1959
 George W. Worthen Jr., 1954–1959
 E. R. Callister, 1959–1975
 R. L. Tuckett, 1966–1976
 A. H. Ellett, 1967–1979
 Richard J. Maughan, 1975–1981
 D. Frank Wilkins, 1976–1980
 Gordon R. Hall, 1977–1994
 I. Daniel Stewart, 1979–2000
 Richard C. Howe, 1980–2003
 Dallin Harris Oaks, 1980–1984
 Christine M. Durham, 1982–2017
 Michael D. Zimmerman, 1984–2000
 Leonard H. Russon, 1994–2003
 Matthew B. Durrant, 2000–present
 Michael J. Wilkins, 2000–2010
 Ronald E. Nehring, 2003–2015
 Jill Parrish, 2003–2015
 Thomas Rex Lee, 2010–2022
 Constandinos Himonas, 2015–2022
 John A. Pearce, 2015–present
 Paige Petersen, 2017–present
 Diana Hagen, 2022–present
 Jill Pohlman, 2022–present

References 
 Supreme Court Agency History, Utah Division of Archives and Records Service

People of Utah Territory
Justices
Lists of United States state supreme court justices